Symphyoloma is a genus of flowering plants belonging to the family Apiaceae. Its only species is Symphyoloma graveolens. Its native range is the Caucasus.

References

Apioideae
Monotypic Apioideae genera